Whitsbury Castle, or Whitsbury Castle Ditches, is the site of an Iron Age univallate hillfort located near the village of Whitsbury in Hampshire. The fort is roughly pear-shaped, located on a chalk outcrop, and covering approximately sixteen acres. The defenses comprise two large ramparts with outer ditches and an additional counter scarp bank on the northern half. The original entrance was at the southwestern corner but has been destroyed by the construction of a post-medieval manor house. The site has been in use throughout the ages, with excavation revealing mesolithic activity, an association with a Bronze Age ranch boundary, an Iron Age hillfort settlement, followed much later by Anglo-Saxon renovation and reuse of the defences. The site is privately owned but is flanked externally on all sides but east by public bridleways.

The site is listed as a scheduled ancient monument no.94.

Location
The site lies at a level of 115m to 120 AOD.

References

See also 
List of places in Hampshire
List of hill forts in England
List of hill forts in Scotland
List of hill forts in Wales



Iron Age sites in England
Hill forts in Hampshire
Archaeological sites in Hampshire